Benhuan (21 September 1907 – 2 April 2012) was a Buddhist monk, Chan master and religious leader in China. He held several abbatial posts, such as being first abbot of the Hongfa Temple in Shenzhen, Guangdong. He was also the honorary president of the Buddhist Association of China in 2010, holding the position until his death in 2012.

Early life
Benhuan was born as Zhang Zhishan in 1907 in Xinzhou, Hubei Province. He went to the old-style private school when he was 7 years old and became an apprentice in the local grocery store. When in his twenties, Zhang gave up home life and took tonsure in the Baoen Temple.

Religious life

In 1930, he went to Baotong Temple to receive and uphold precepts in Wuchang. In that same year, he came to the Gaoyu Temple and formally acknowledged Laiguo as his master, where he spent 7 years in practicing the Dharma. In February 1937, he spared no effort to worship at the shrine on Mount Wutai and then lived in Bishan temple. Two years later, he became the third Master Monk Guan there.

In 1947, he visited many other temples all over China,  namely Mile Monastery in Beijing, Jushi Lodge in Tianjin and Puji Temple in Shanghai. In 1948, he left Mount Wutai for Nanhua Temple in Guangdong Province to take the place of Master Hsu Yun. In January 1949, he acceded to the abbotship of Nanhua temple.  In April, 1980, the people's government of Huanan county and the Buddhist community invited him to be the abbot of Biechuan Temple in Danxia Mountain. In January 1987 he acceded to the abbotship of Guangxiao Temple in Guangzhou; from 1992 to 2008 he was elected the abbot of Hongfa Temple, at that point in time he was known as the "Greatest in Chinese Buddhism".

As a religious leader in Mainland China, Benhuan served as honorary president of the Buddhist Association of China (a post he was elected to in 2010), honorary president of the Buddhist Association of Hubei Province and Guangdong Province, the president of the Shenzhen Buddhism Association, the honorary president of the Buddhist Association of Shaoguan City, and the Chinese People's Political Consultative Conference in Guangdong Province.

Personality
Benhuan’s legendary spiritual and religious cultivation include, as legend has it, sitting in meditation that lasted 91 days without sleep in his youth; locking himself in a temple for seven years; spending an entire year travelling on a pilgrimage from Baoding in Hebei Province to Wutai Mountain in Shanxi Province; and copying 19 Buddhist scriptures with more than 200,000 characters with blood from his fingers and tongue.

He was also known for his good memory. According to his disciple Yin Shun, who is now the abbot of Hongfa Temple, Ben Huan once instantly recognized a visitor who visited him five years before. The famous monk would have tens of thousands of visitors every day asking for blessings. These "blessing seekers" would include important government officials and successful businesspeople, and all would be treated equally.

Influence

Benhuan became a monk in 1930 and was the 44th generation lineage holder of the Linji school. He promoted Buddhism in more than 20 countries and regions, attracting more than 2 million followers.

He was regarded as an eminent Buddhist both in China and overseas. He was also a generous philanthropist. During his 80 years of Buddhist practice, he donated more than 10 million yuan (US $1.59 million) to building roads, schools and hospitals across the country. Hongfa Temple’s donations and contributions to public facilities and charitable organizations totaled more than 50 million yuan.

He became a centenarian in 2007, and died on April 2, 2012, age 104. Benhuan died in the Hongfa Temple in Shenzhen, Guangdong Province, according to an announcement of the temple posted on its official website.

References

External links

 Benhuan

1907 births
2012 deaths
Republic of China Buddhist monks
Rinzai Buddhists
People from Shenzhen
Chinese centenarians
People's Republic of China Buddhist monks
20th-century Chinese people
21st-century Chinese people
Men centenarians